Doubtful is a 2017 Israeli social drama film, written and directed by Eliran Elya, produced by Oren Rogovin, starring Ran Danker, as Assi, screenwriter and a poet, sentenced to community service as a juvenile delinquency teacher. The film was screened at the Jerusalem Film Festival 2017 and won two awards: Best First Film, Best Cinematography to Shai Goldman, and honorary mention for his performance to Adar Hazazi. Doubtful was nominated for nine Ophir Awards, including Best Actor, Best Director, and Best Film. The film produced following the support of the Israeli Film Fund, Yes, and Gesher Multicultural Film Fund.

The film is based on actual events, took place in the director's life, Eliya played by Danker. The juvenile actors have no former experience, it's their debut cinematic appearance.

Plot

Following a motorcycle  accident, Assi (Ran Danker), screenwriter and poet from Tel Aviv, sentence to community service as a cinema teacher in a development town in southern Israel. His student are a juvenile delinquency. At the beginning, Assi find it difficult to communicate with the boys, but due to his uncompromising efforts, he paved a way to their heart. Assi develop close relationship with Eden (Adar Hazazi Gersch), young man who collect bottles for recycling in order to fulfill a dream.  Assi try to help Eden break through the boundaries of his life.

Cast

 Ran Danker as Assi
 Adar Hazazi Gersch as Eden
 Hilla Sarjon as Alma
 Liron Ben-Shlush as Liraz
 Batel Moseri as Rina
 Osher Amara as Daniel
 Elroi Fas as Naor
 Melodi Frank as Alona
 Shalev Girgin as Michael
 Elad Hudara as Elad
 Riki Hudara as Riki
 Idan Naftali as David-El
 Orel Sapir as Orel 
 Yaakov Aderet as Nachum
 Eli Menashe as Police officer

Awards and nominations

References

External links
 
 Doubtful at Israeli Film Fund
 Doubtful at Jerusalem Film Festival
 Doubtful at Israeli Academy of Film and Television

2017 films
2017 thriller drama films
Israeli thriller drama films
2010s Hebrew-language films